Luis Ignacio Fernández Villalba (born 1 May 1989 in Paraguay) is a Paraguayan footballer. His last club was Deportivo Capiatá.

References
 
 

1989 births
Living people
Paraguayan footballers
Paraguayan expatriate footballers
Atlético Colegiales players
Magallanes footballers
Lota Schwager footballers
Santiago Morning footballers
Sportivo Luqueño players
Primera B de Chile players
Expatriate footballers in Chile
Association football midfielders